Norvik is a surname. Notable people with this surname include:

 Erling Johannes Norvik (1899-1964), Norwegian politician
 Erling Norvik (1928-1998), Norwegian politician
 Harald Norvik (born 1946), Norwegian businessman

See also
 Norvik Banka, previous name of PNB Banka, Latvian bank
 Norvik press, founded by James McFarlane
 Nordvik (disambiguation)